The 2020 Sun Belt women's soccer tournament was the postseason women's soccer tournament for the Sun Belt Conference. The tournament was contested over four days between November 2–8 at the Foley Sports Tourism Complex in Foley, Alabama. The South Alabama Jaguars successfully defended their title, defeating Arkansas State in the final, 2–1, to win their seventh Sun Belt tournament championship in the last eight years.

Teams

Bracket

Match summaries 
All matches were played at Foley Sports Tourism Complex in Foley, Alabama. All times are Central.

First Round

Quarterfinals

Semifinals

Championship

See also 

 Sun Belt Conference
 2020 NCAA Division I women's soccer season
 2020 NCAA Division I Women's Soccer Tournament

References 

2020 Southeastern Conference women's soccer season
Women's sports in Alabama